Paolo Vietti-Violi (June 20, 1882, Grandson, Switzerland - December 25, 1965, Vogogna, Italy) was an Italian architect. His work was part of the architecture event in the art competition at the 1928 Summer Olympics.

Life 

Born in the French-speaking Switzerland from Italian parents who resided there for business, he studied in Geneva and Paris (at the Ecole des Beaux-Arts) from which he graduated in 1907.

He moved to Milan where in 1914 he re-graduated at the Royal Polytechnic in order to practice his profession in Italy. He then began a career as a designer in the field of sports facilities such as racetracks, stadiums and their complementary structures. His design universe, however, was very large and varied, as evidenced by the different architectural aspects, which are identifiable in the rationalism of the time, still soaked from the original neo-classical French style.

He worked not only in Italy but also in several countries of the Central Europe; he also realized several projects in Turkey, then in India, East Africa and South America (including a Jockey Club in Argentina).

His skills gained him the respect of kings, rulers and aristocrats. In 1907 he married Maria Biraghi Lossetti, an aristocratic heiress of the Lords of Vogogna Biraghi Lossetti, who bore him the following year his son Emanuele, who became an architect and his collaborator in Milan. He was an artillery officer in Genoa during the First World War and in 1944 he became the Mayor of Vogogna during the partisan Republic of Ossola.

Vietti-Violi died in Vogogna at 83 on the Christmas Day of 1965. He was still working on the racecourse Parilly of Lyon and at the new church of Villadossola assisted by his assistant at the time, the architect Vladimiro Francioli.

Works
Paolo Vietti-Violi's sketches can be found in the collection of Milan Jovanović Stojimirović who bequeathed his vast collection of paintings, etchings and artifacts to the Art Department of the Museum in Smederevo.

Notes

Bibliography 
 Maria Canella, Sergio Giuntini, "Sport e fascismo", Collana La società moderna e contemporanea, Argomenti Storia sociale e demografica - Storia della cultura e del costume, pp. 544, 1a edizione 2009(Codice editore 1501.110)Franco Angeli Edizioni Codice 
 Raffaele Calzini, Paolo Vietti-Violi, Éditions "Les Archives internationales", 1932
 Sibel Bozdoğan, "Modernism and Nation Building: Turkish Architectural Culture in the Early Republic", 2001 by the University of Washington Press, printed in Singapore, 
 Simon Martin, Football and Fascism: The National Game Under Mussolin i - Berg, 2004, New York, USA
 I.N. Aslanoglu, "Two Italian Architects: Giulio Mongeri and Paolo Vietti-Violi during the Periods of First Nationalism and Early Modernism in Ankara," in "Atti del Convegno Architettura e architetti italiani ad Istanbul tra il XIX e il XX secolo", Facoltà di architettura dell' Università Mimar Sinan, Istanbul 27-28 novembre 1995

1882 births
1965 deaths
20th-century Italian architects
Swiss architects
Olympic competitors in art competitions
Italian expatriates in Switzerland
Italian expatriates in France